Lasionycta benjamini is a moth of the family Noctuidae. It is found in the Sierra Nevada of California and in the mountains of Nevada and Colorado.

The habitat is montane conifer forest.

Adults are on wing from late June to mid-August.

Subspecies
Lasionycta benjamini benjamini (California and Nevada)
Lasionycta benjamini medaminosa (Colorado)

External links
A Revision of Lasionycta Aurivillius (Lepidoptera, Noctuidae) for North America and notes on Eurasian species, with descriptions of 17 new species, 6 new subspecies, a new genus, and two new species of Tricholita Grote

Lasionycta
Moths described in 1927